Lerchenfeld may refer to:
Lerchenfeld (noble family)
 Lerchenfeld, a neighborhood of Krems, Austria
Lerchenfeld Glacier, an Antarctic glacier
Zugló (German: Lerchenfeld), a district of Budapest, Hungary